The 2006 Exeter City Council election took place on 4 May 2006, to elect members of Exeter City Council in Devon, England. The election was held concurrently with other local elections in England. One third of the council was up for election and the council remained under no overall control.

Results summary

Ward results

Alphington

Cowick

Duryard

Exwick

Heavitree

Mincinglake

Newtown

Pennsylvania

Pinhoe

Polsloe

Priory

St Davids

Whipton & Barton

References

2006 English local elections
2006
2000s in Exeter